Voharika Tissa (a.k.a. Vira Tissa or Voharikathissa) was King of Anuradhapura in the 3rd century, whose reign lasted from 215 to 237. He succeeded his father Siri Naga I as King of Anuradhapura and was succeeded by his brother Abhaya Naga.

He made a number of political reforms during his reign and is regarded as a ruler who established and promoted non-violence in the Anuradhapura kingdom. Voharika Tissa also made several attempts to suppress the spreading of the Vaitulya doctrine, a form of Mahayana Buddhism, which arrived at Sri Lanka during his time and spread among the bhikkus of Abhayagiri Vihara.

See also
 List of Sri Lankan monarchs
 History of Sri Lanka

References

External links
 Kings & Rulers of Sri Lanka
 Codrington's Short History of Ceylon

Monarchs of Anuradhapura
V
V
V